The Hy-Tek Hurricane 103 is a family of single-engined, high wing tricycle gear-equipped aircraft that were available in kit form from Hy-Tek Hurricane of Aurora, Oregon.

The Hurricane 103 and Ultra 103 designs are intended to have empty weights under  and fit into the US FAR 103 ultralight category. The remaining designs are heavier and fit into the US Experimental - Amateur-built category.

Development
The Hurricane was originally developed as a clone of the Phantom X1 design by Jack Britton in the late 1980s and marketed under the name Avenger. Following Britton's death the design was acquired by Donnie Eccker who marketed it as the Hurricane. The aircraft was introduced to the market in 1991 and benefited from the end of production of the Phantom that same year. As a result of the timing, the quality of the kits produced and the low price, the aircraft quickly achieved market success.

In 1996 the rights to the design along with the tooling were sold to Hy-Tek. The aircraft is no longer in production.

Design
As a copy of the Phantom X1, the Hurricane family shares its construction. The wings, tail and fuselage are constructed of anodized aluminum tubing, bolted together. The wings and tail surfaces are covered with Dacron envelopes. The wings are supported by cable-bracing from an inverted V-kingpost. The cockpit fairing, or pod, is made from fibreglass. The aircraft features tricycle landing gear. The engine is mounted on the front of the main tube, the tail being mounted on the far end of the same tube.

The kit takes 80-100 hrs to assemble.

Variants
Hurricane 103
Ultra 103
Hurricane HP Clipwing
Hurricane Hauler
Hurricane II
Two seats in side-by-side seating configuration, with dual controls and dual throttles, sold as an ultralight trainer. The wing is wire-braced from a  kingpost. The wing is fitted with flaps and the elevator features a trim system. The standard engine is the  Rotax 503.

Specifications (Hurricane 103)

See also

References

External links
 Photo of Hurricane 103

Aircraft manufactured in the United States
1990s United States ultralight aircraft